The 1924 Dover by-election was held on 12 March 1924.  The by-election was held due to incumbent Conservative MP, John Jacob Astor, voting in the House of Commons of the United Kingdom before he had taken the Parliamentary Oath of Allegiance.  Astor was unopposed at the by-election and retained the seat.

References

1924 in England
History of Dover, Kent
1924 elections in the United Kingdom
By-elections to the Parliament of the United Kingdom in Kent constituencies
Unopposed by-elections to the Parliament of the United Kingdom (need citation)
1920s in Kent